is a Japanese footballer currently playing as a goalkeeper for Vanraure Hachinohe.

Career statistics

Club
.

Notes

References

External links

1996 births
Living people
Japanese footballers
Association football goalkeepers
Sendai University alumni
J3 League players
Vanraure Hachinohe players